This is a list of German football transfers in the summer transfer window 2012 by club. Only transfers of the Bundesliga, and 2. Bundesliga are included.

Bundesliga

Borussia Dortmund

In:

Out:

Note: Flags indicate national team as has been defined under FIFA eligibility rules. Players may hold more than one non-FIFA nationality.

FC Bayern Munich

In: 

Out:

FC Schalke 04

In:

Out:

Borussia Mönchengladbach

In:

Out:

Bayer 04 Leverkusen

In:

Out:

VfB Stuttgart

In:

Out:

Hannover 96

In:

Out:

VfL Wolfsburg

In:

Out:

Werder Bremen

In:

Out:

1. FC Nürnberg

In:

Out:

TSG 1899 Hoffenheim

In:

Out:

SC Freiburg

In:

 
 
 
 

Out:

1. FSV Mainz 05

In:

Out:

FC Augsburg

In:

Out:

Hamburger SV

In:

Out:

SpVgg Greuther Fürth

In:

 

Out:

Eintracht Frankfurt

In:

Out:

Fortuna Düsseldorf

In:

Out:

2. Bundesliga

Hertha BSC

In:

Out:

1. FC Köln

In:

Out:

1. FC Kaiserslautern

In:

Out:

FC St. Pauli

In:

Out:

SC Paderborn 07

In:

Out:

TSV 1860 Munich

In:

Out:

1. FC Union Berlin

In:

Out:

Eintracht Braunschweig

In:

Out:

Dynamo Dresden

In:

Out:

MSV Duisburg

In:

Out:

VfL Bochum

In:

Out:

FC Ingolstadt 04

In:

Out:

FSV Frankfurt

In:

Out:

Energie Cottbus

In:

Out:

FC Erzgebirge Aue

In:

Out:

SV Sandhausen

In:

Out:

VfR Aalen

In:

Out:

Jahn Regensburg

In:

Out:

See also
 2012–13 Bundesliga
 2012–13 2. Bundesliga

References

External links
 Official site of the DFB 
 kicker.de 
 Official site of the Bundesliga 
 Official site of the Bundesliga 

Football transfers summer 2012
Trans
2012